Electric Wizard/Our Haunted Kingdom is a split-single released by the English stoner metal bands Electric Wizard and Our Haunted Kingdom, who changed their name to Orange Goblin after this release. It was released during 1996 on 7" vinyl through Rise Above Records.

The Electric Wizard song, "Demon Lung", later appeared as a bonus track on a remastered version of their album Come My Fanatics....
The Our Haunted Kingdom song, "Aquatic Fanatic", later appeared on their debut album Frequencies from Planet Ten, after they became Orange Goblin.
The band Black Widow from England appears on the cover art.

Track listing

Electric Wizard 
"Demon Lung" – 5:52

Our Haunted Kingdom 
"Aquatic Fanatic" – 4:27

Personnel

Electric Wizard 
Jus Oborn – guitar, vocals
Tim Bagshaw – bass
Mark Greening – drums

Our Haunted Kingdom 
Ben Ward – guitar, vocals
Pete O'Malley – guitar
Martyn Millard – bass
Chris Turner – drums

Orange Goblin albums
Electric Wizard albums
Rise Above Records albums
Split EPs
1996 EPs